In mathematics, the simplest form of the parallelogram law (also called the parallelogram identity) belongs to elementary geometry.  It states that the sum of the squares of the lengths of the four sides of a parallelogram equals the sum of the squares of the lengths of the two diagonals. We use these notations for the sides: AB, BC, CD, DA.  But since in Euclidean geometry a parallelogram necessarily has opposite sides equal, that is, AB = CD and BC = DA, the law can be stated as

If the parallelogram is a rectangle, the two diagonals are of equal lengths AC = BD, so

and the statement reduces to the Pythagorean theorem. For the general quadrilateral with four sides not necessarily equal,

where  is the length of the line segment joining the midpoints of the diagonals.  It can be seen from the diagram that  for a parallelogram, and so the general formula simplifies to the parallelogram law.

Proof 

In the parallelogram on the right, let AD = BC = a, AB = DC = b,  By using the law of cosines in triangle  we get:

In a parallelogram, adjacent angles are supplementary, therefore  Using the law of cosines in triangle  produces:

By applying the trigonometric identity  to the former result proves:

Now the sum of squares  can be expressed as:

Simplifying this expression, it becomes:

The parallelogram law in inner product spaces 

In a normed space, the statement of the parallelogram law is an equation relating norms:

The parallelogram law is equivalent to the seemingly weaker statement:

With the same proof, the parallelogram law is also equivalent to:

In an inner product space, the norm is determined using the inner product:

As a consequence of this definition, in an inner product space the parallelogram law is an algebraic identity, readily established using the properties of the inner product:

Adding these two expressions:

as required.

If  is orthogonal to  meaning  and the above equation for the norm of a sum becomes:
 in the real coordinate space  is the -norm:

Given a norm, one can evaluate both sides of the parallelogram law above. A remarkable fact is that if the parallelogram law holds, then the norm must arise in the usual way from some inner product. In particular, it holds for the -norm if and only if  the so-called  norm or  norm.

For any norm satisfying the parallelogram law (which necessarily is an inner product norm), the inner product generating the norm is unique as a consequence of the polarization identity. In the real case, the polarization identity is given by:

or equivalently by

In the complex case it is given by:

which is the standard dot product of two vectors.

Another necessary and sufficient condition for there to exist an inner product that induces the given norm  is for the norm to satisfy Ptolemy's inequality:

See also

References

External links 

 
 The Parallelogram Law Proven Simply at Dreamshire blog
 The Parallelogram Law: A Proof Without Words at cut-the-knot

Euclidean geometry
Theorems about quadrilaterals